At the 1988 Summer Olympics, two different gymnastics disciplines were contested: artistic gymnastics and rhythmic gymnastics.  The artistic gymnastics events were held at the Olympic Gymnastics Hall in Seoul from September 18 through 25th.  The rhythmic gymnastics events were held at the same venue from September 28 through 30th.

For the first time in Olympic competition, each routine in women's artistic gymnastics events was judged by six judges, with the final score composed of the average of the judges' scores, after the highest and lowest marks were dropped.  Men's routines continued to be judged by four judges, as at previous Olympics.

Artistic gymnastics

Format of competition
The gymnastics competition at the 1988 Summer Olympics was carried out in three stages:

Competition I - The team competition/qualification round in which all gymnasts, including those who were not part of a team, performed both compulsory and optional exercises.  The top five scores per team on each exercise determined the final score of the team.  The thirty-six highest scoring gymnasts in the all-around qualified to the individual all-around competition.  The eight highest scoring gymnasts on each apparatus qualified to the final for that apparatus.
Competition II - The individual all-around competition, in which those who qualified from Competition I performed exercises on each apparatus.  The final score of each gymnast was composed of half the points earned by that gymnast during Competition I and all of the points earned by him or her in Competition II.
Competition III - The apparatus finals, in which those who qualified during Competition I performed an exercise on the individual apparatus on which he or she had qualified.  The final score of each gymnast was composed of half the points earned by that gymnast on that particular apparatus during Competition I and all of the points earned by him or her on that particular apparatus in Competition III.

Each country was limited to three gymnasts in the all-around final and two gymnasts in each apparatus final.

Men's events

Women's events

Rhythmic gymnastics
Rules for the rhythmic gymnastics competition also changed since the previous Olympics. The ball apparatus was replaced by the rope. Thirty-nine gymnasts competed in the preliminary round, the format for which was similar to the finals. The twenty best gymnasts competed in the finals.  Each competitor's score in the preliminary round, divided by two (the "prelim" score) was added to gymnast's score in the finals (the "final" score).

Each of the routines was judged by six judges, highest and lowest marks were dropped, and an average of the four remaining ones was the gymnast's score for the routine.

Medal summary

References

External links
 Official Olympic Report
 www.gymnasticsresults.com

 
1988
1988 Summer Olympics events
1988 in gymnastics